Deya is a rural locality (a station) in Preobrazhensky Selsoviet of Zavitinsky District, Amur Oblast, Russia. The population was 22 as of 2018.

Geography 
Deya is located 17 km southeast of Zavitinsk (the district's administrative centre) by road. Valuyevo is the nearest rural locality.

References 

Rural localities in Zavitinsky District